Edward Vickers (1804-1897) was the founder of Naylor Vickers & Co. which became Vickers Limited.

Career
Vickers was a successful miller who invested his money in the railway industry. In 1828 he garnered control of his father-in-law's steel foundry business, formerly Naylor & Sanderson, and renamed it Naylor Vickers & Co. He went on to be Alderman and the Mayor of Sheffield and was the first President of the Sheffield Chamber of Commerce before he died in 1897.

Family
In 1828 he married Anne Naylor, they had seven children (George Naylor (1830-1889) who married Maria Jackson, granddaughter of steelmaker James Jackson, Thomas Edward (1833-1915), Sarah Ann (1836-1919),  (1838-1919), Frederick (1840-?), Gertrude L. (1845-?) and Isabel (1847-?)).

References

Sources

1804 births
1897 deaths
19th-century British businesspeople